Pine needle tea or pine leaf tea is a herbal tea made from pine needles, or the leaves of pine trees (trees of the genus Pinus). In Korea, the tea made from the leaves of Korean red pine (P. densiflora) or Manchurian red pine (P. tabuliformis) is known as solip-cha, while the tea made from the leaves of Korean pine (P. koraiensis) is known as jannip-cha or baek yeop-Cha. In North America, pine needle tea may be made from the leaves of Eastern white pine (P. strobus) and Loblolly, Virginia Pine, Long Leaf Pine.

Preparation

Solip-cha 
Solip-cha is a herbal tea made mostly from the leaves and needles of Korean red pine or Manchurian red pine. Pine needles are usually harvested around December; preferably before midday; from 10 to 20 year-old trees located mid-mountain and facing southeast, that have grown in sunny places. Two types of sollip-cha can be made:

The first method uses fresh or dried pine needles. The harvested leaves are soaked in water for a day and then cleaned, rinsed, trimmed of the sharp tips, and halved or cut into three pieces. They can be used right away or dried in a shaded area before being used. As the tea has the properties of an astringent, honey or sugar is added to improve taste.

The second method consists of using fermented pine needles. Well-fermented sollip-cha is filtered with cloth and consumed as cold tea.

Jannip-cha 
The leaves that grow eastward are harvested for making the tea.  of fresh pine needles are washed, drained, and boiled in  water. When it comes to a boil, it is brewed on a low heat, and drunk without the leaves.

See also 
Aneda - used by the St. Lawrence Iroquoians to cure scurvy, sometimes described as "pine needle tea", though more commonly thought to have been Thuja occidentalis

References 

Herbal tea
Korean tea